Michael McShane is an American actor, singer, and improvisational comedian. He appeared on the original British television show Whose Line Is It Anyway? (1988–97) and went on to appear in films such as Tucker: The Man and His Dream (1988), Robin Hood: Prince of Thieves (1991), Richie Rich (1994), and Office Space (1999). McShane has also been involved in several Disney productions, including Tom and Huck (1995), the television series Brotherly Love (1995–97), and Tower of Terror (1997). He also voiced the Revolting Slob in the Canadian-American variety television series Crashbox.

McShane voiced Marlon, Caracticus P. Doom and various other characters in Cosgrove Hall Films's Avenger Penguins (1993–94), Gareb in Todd McFarlane's Spawn (1997–99), and Quosmir in Dave The Barbarian (2004–05).

Career
McShane studied drama at San Joaquin Delta College and San Francisco State University, performing with Faultline Theatre, the San Francisco Shakespeare Festival, American Conservatory Theater and the Eureka Theatre. McShane is also an alumnus of Los Angeles Theatresports.

McShane gained exposure in the early 1990s from semi-regular appearances on the British show Whose Line Is It Anyway?. He later appeared with fellow Whose Line players Tony Slattery in the comedy sketch show S&M and Sandi Toksvig in the sitcom The Big One.

Other TV roles include a guest appearance on Seinfeld as Kramer's nemesis Franklin Delano Romanowski (FDR). McShane played Friar Tuck in Robin Hood, Prince of Thieves in 1991, had a small role as a doomed hypnotherapist in the 1999 film Office Space, and played the friendly scientist, Professor Keenbean, in the 1994 movie Richie Rich. In 1998 he appeared in an episode of Frasier as Frank, the manager of the Shangri-La apartments. He also co-starred with Sir John Gielgud, Emily Watson and Rosemary Harris in "A Summer's Day Dream" for BBC "Performance" series.

In 1995, McShane starred as Harley in the BBC Screen Two TV Movie Crazy For A Kiss, about a young boy who is sent to a mental institution for teenagers in McShane's home state of Kansas. McShane appeared in Tom and Huck as Muff Potter and on Brotherly Love as the experienced but wisecracking mechanic, Lloyd.

In 1997 he appeared in Tower of Terror, a TV movie starring Steve Guttenberg and Kirsten Dunst based on the Disney attraction, as "Q".

McShane also appeared with Dunst in the 1999 comedy film Drop Dead Gorgeous, playing a quick-tempered beauty pageant judge who serves as caretaker for his learning disabled brother.

McShane provided voice work for the anime Vampire Hunter D: Bloodlust, as D's sarcastic possessed left hand. He also provided the voice of Detective Twitch in the HBO animated series Spawn. Other voice work by McShane includes the characters of Tuck and Roll, the twin pill bugs in A Bug's Life and the video game of the same name in 1998. He also provided the voice of Shalulu in Disney's redub of Castle in the Sky, and Baron Rakan Harkonnen in the 2001 strategy game Emperor: Battle for Dune. He provided the voice for Cid in the video games Final Fantasy X and Final Fantasy X-2.

McShane appeared as the voice of Audrey II (as well as playing a number of peripheral characters) in the London revival of Little Shop of Horrors at the Menier Chocolate Factory in Southwark between December 2006 and February 2007. The show was a critical success and was sold out for the duration of its run, and Mike had been contracted to continue in the role following the show's transfer to the West End at the Duke of York theatre. In September 2007 he took part in the British Library's celebration of Jack Kerouac, reading excerpts from On The Road on the 50th anniversary of its publication.

In 2008, McShane appeared as a guest performer in Paul Merton's Impro Chums, a live improv show, and was asked to join the permanent company for three UK tours, and is still ongoing with the group. and as Dr. Vaabit in episode 5 of BBC's sitcom Lab Rats, and has appeared twice on the BBC radio programme Just a Minute.

In September 2012, McShane appeared as the character Grayle in the television series Doctor Who in the series 7 episode "The Angels Take Manhattan". In November 2012, Mike starred as a CIA military consultant in BBC Three comedy series Bluestone 42. In February 2013, Mike created the role of Louis B. Mayer in the new musical "The Tailor Made Man" at The Arts Theatre in London's West End, garnering rave reviews.

On May 17, 2013, Radio 5 Live's breakfast show accidentally announced Mike McShane had died. This was following the death of Paul Shane on May 16, 2013. A retraction was issued.

In 2014, McShane was in the horror comedy film Love in the Time of Monsters. From November 2014 through March 2015, he appeared in the Stephen Sondheim musical Assassins at the Menier Chocolate Factory.

In August 2015 McShane appeared at an Edinburgh Fringe gala regarding mental health issues. At the same time he paid tribute to his friend Robin Williams. McShane said: “I worked with Robin when we were young and he came to see me backstage in the past, too. Any improviser my age or younger was inspired by him...Even with his condition he was still doing benefit gigs, making servicemen laugh and championing young acts. He would pick you up and make you feel like the exploration of your imagination and expression was a good thing. Laughter is good. It's group consensus and a release of tension.”

In 2016, McShane starred as Sam in the Western web series Red Bird.

Filmography

References

External links
 

Living people
American male comedians
American male film actors
American male stage actors
American male television actors
American male video game actors
American male voice actors
20th-century American male actors
21st-century American male actors
San Francisco State University alumni
20th-century American comedians
21st-century American comedians
Year of birth missing (living people)